Republic of Hope (Polish: Republika nadziei) is a 1988 Polish historical film created by Zbigniew Kuźmiński and written by Kuźmiński and Kazimierz Radowicz. Film is based on the miniseries The Republic of Ostrów (Polish: Republika Ostrowska) which premiered on TVP on June 4, 1986.

Set in 1918, the film revolves around two landed gentry families (Kroguleccy and Wodniczakowie) from Greater Poland whose lives intersect. At its core, it is the story of the secret society (The Tomasz Zan Society) which helped organizing a short-lived autonomous republic called the Republic of Ostrów. The film explores a wide variety of themes, including Greater Poland uprising (1918–19), Polish youth lives during the age of partitions, and a rapidly changing social and political climate.

Republic of Hope earned much critical acclaim and accolades including the 1986 Golden Screen Award. It was filmed between 1984 and 1985 in Gołuchów Castle and Schloss Gorkau among others, and released in 1988.

Cast 

 Andrzej Szczytko as Feliks Krogulecki
 Jolanta Grusznic as Kornelia Biniewska - von Zwirner
 Zbigniew Bogdański as Beck
 Ryszard Dembiński as Nepomucen Wodniczak, 
 Jerzy Kamas as Stefan Rowiński
 Leon Niemczyk as Jost
 Michał Pawlicki as profesor Schaps
 Czesław Wołłejko as Wojciech Lipski,
 Bogusław Augustyn as Włodzimierz Lewandowski
 Jacek Guziński as Filip Krogulecki,
 Jan Jankowski as Florian Krogulecki,
 Bogdan Kochanowski as Wiktor Urbaniak
 Tomasz Mędrzak as Edward Wodniczak
 Krzysztof Milkowski as Oskar von Wedow
 Barbara Brylska as pani Wodniczakowa, 
 Alicja Jachiewicz as Kazimiera Rowińska
 Bożena Miller-Małecka as Bogusia Wodniczakówna, 
 Zdzisław Kozień as hrabia Szembek, 
 Gustaw Kron as mecenas Lange-Wnukowski, 
 Eugeniusz Kujawski as Kurzezunge
 Witold Skaruch as Ziegert
 Czesław Jaroszyński as Aleksander Dubiski, 
 Stefan Paska as Mertka, 
 Tomasz Zaliwski as Walerian Krogulecki

References

External links
 

1988 films
Polish historical films
1980s Polish-language films
1980s historical films